Alex Russell was a footballer who played as a midfielder in the Football League for Southport, Blackburn Rovers, Tranmere Rovers and Crewe Alexandra.

He then had a three-year spell playing for non-league Formby. His debut was on 8 November 1975 at Witton Albion, a week before the debut of Ron Smith. Russell stayed with the Squirrels, frequently playing as captain, for three years, including lifting the Liverpool Senior Cup in August 1978. He left the club in November 1978.

References

1944 births
Living people
Sportspeople from Seaham
Footballers from County Durham
Association football midfielders
English footballers
Everton F.C. players
Southport F.C. players
Blackburn Rovers F.C. players
Tranmere Rovers F.C. players
Crewe Alexandra F.C. players
Formby F.C. players
Los Angeles Aztecs players
English expatriate footballers
Expatriate soccer players in the United States
North American Soccer League (1968–1984) players
English Football League players
English expatriate sportspeople in the United States